Dizaj (also Romanized as Dīzaj) is a village in Sharifabad Rural District, Mohammadiyeh District, Alborz County, Qazvin Province, Iran. At the 2006 census, its population was 311, in 86 families.

References 

Populated places in Alborz County